The Internationaux de Strasbourg (formally known as the Strasbourg Grand Prix) is a professional women's tennis tournament held in Strasbourg, France. It is an International-level outdoor event of the WTA Tour played on clay courts. The tournament has been organized in May since its inception in 1987 and serves as a warm-up event to the French Open which is played a week later.

The tournament was played at the Hautepierre before moving to the Strasbourg’s Tennis Club in 2011.

Past champions of the tournament include former world number ones Steffi Graf (singles), Jennifer Capriati (singles), Lindsay Davenport (two singles, one doubles), Maria Sharapova (singles), Angelique Kerber (singles), Martina Navratilova (doubles), and Ashleigh Barty (two doubles). The current champion  is the German Angelique Kerber, having defeated the Slovenian Kaja Juvan in three sets.

Past finals

Singles

Doubles

See also
List of tennis tournaments

References

External links
 
 Women's Tennis Association(WTA) tournament profile

 
Tennis tournaments in France
Clay court tennis tournaments
WTA Tour
Sport in Strasbourg
Recurring sporting events established in 1987
1987 establishments in France